Kondrajec Pański is a village in the administrative district of Gmina Glinojeck, within Ciechanów County, Masovian Voivodeship, in east-central Poland.

The village has an approximate population of 460.

References

Villages in Ciechanów County